The Consolidated Farm and Rural Development Act of 1972 or Con Act (P.L. 92-419) authorized a major expansion of USDA lending activities, which at the time were administered by Farmers Home Administration (FmHA).  The legislation was originally enacted as the Consolidated Farmers Home Administration Act of 1961 (P.L. 87-128).  In 1972, this title was changed to the Consolidated Farm and Rural Development Act, and is often referred to as the Con Act.

The H.R. 12931 legislation was passed by the 92nd U.S. Congressional session and enacted by the 37th President of the United States Richard Nixon on August 30, 1972.

The Con Act, as amended, currently serves as the authorizing statute for USDA's agricultural and rural development lending programs.  The Act includes current authority for the following three major Farm Service Agency (FSA) farm loan programs: farm ownership loans, farm operating loans, and emergency disaster loans.

Also the Act authorizes rural development loans and grants. (7 U.S.C. 1921 et seq.).

See also
 Consolidated Farm and Rural Development Act of 1961

References

External links
 
 
 
 

United States federal agriculture legislation
1972 in law
1972 in the United States
92nd United States Congress